Selbustrand Church is a parish church of the Church of Norway in Selbu municipality in Trøndelag county, Norway. It is located in the village of Selbustrand. It is one of the churches for the Selbu parish which is part of the Stjørdal prosti (deanery) in the Diocese of Nidaros. The white, wooden church was built in a long church style in 1901 using plans drawn up by the architect Olaf Jarl Alstad. The church seats about 300 people.

History
The chapel at Selbustrand was built in 1901. It was the first church in the village. Later it was upgraded to the status of parish church.

See also
List of churches in Nidaros

References

Selbu
Churches in Trøndelag
Long churches in Norway
Wooden churches in Norway
20th-century Church of Norway church buildings
Churches completed in 1901
1901 establishments in Norway